A farrier is a specialist in equine hoof care.

Farrier may also refer to:

People with the name 
 Ancil Farrier (born 1986), Trinidadian football player
 Curt Farrier (born 1941), American football player
 David Farrier (born 1982), New Zealand journalist
 Fred Farrier (born 1972), American football coach and former player

 Ian Farrier (1947-2017), New Zealand boat designer
 Robert Farrier (1796–1879), English artist

Other uses 
 Operation Farrier, during the Second World War
 Farrier Marine, a boat builder of New Zealand
 MV Empire Farrier, a British ship

See also 
 
 Ferrier (disambiguation)
 Farrer (disambiguation)
 Faria (disambiguation)